Mediterraneo is a 1991 Italian war comedy-drama film directed by Gabriele Salvatores and written by Enzo Monteleone. The film is set during World War II and concerns a group of Italian soldiers who become stranded on a Greek island in the Aegean Sea, and are left behind by the war. It won the Academy Award for Best Foreign Language Film in 1992.

Plot
In 1941, one year after Italy joined Germany against the Allies in World War II, a small group of misfit Italian soldiers is sent to a small Greek island in the Aegean Sea for four months of lookout duty. The soldiers include a lieutenant who likes art, a macho sergeant, a ski instructor accompanied by his beloved donkey Silvana, and other quirky people. They are not very good soldiers, but a cross section of average, independent men, who like the Greeks (and the occasional visiting Turk), are Mediterraneans, who greatly resemble the locals in appearance and culture—a catchphrase "One face, one race" occurs throughout the film.

The soldiers anticipate attack from outside and on the island, and take all sorts of inept precautions. They find a small town with no people. That night, they see bombing on the horizon and by radio interception, discover that the ship that was intended to pick them up has been destroyed. Mysteriously, people reappear in the village: the villagers say they hid because the Germans had taken all the men, but having seen that the Italians are absolutely harmless they have decided to return to their lives. It's not long before everyone's sunny nature appears. The Italian soldiers, unacquainted with a war they clearly do not sense as theirs, are absorbed into the life, heat and landscape of the idyllic island.

The local orthodox priest asks the lieutenant, an amateur painter, to restore the murals in his church. Two soldiers, who are brothers, befriend a lovely young woman, a shepherdess. They eventually consummate their friendship with the shepherdess who in turn loves them both equally. Sergeant Lo Russo, the only member of the crew with a fiery spirit for war, takes up folk dancing and begins to reflect on his place in the universe. Meanwhile, the shyest soldier, Farina, falls in love with the island's prostitute, named Vasilissa.

In their old age, three of the men are reunited on the island

Cast
 Diego Abatantuono as Sgt. Nicola Lo Russo
 Claudio Bigagli as Lt. Raffaele Montini
 Giuseppe Cederna as Pvt. Antonio Farina
 Claudio Bisio as Pvt. Corrado Noventa
 Luigi Alberti as Pvt. Eliseo Strazzabosco
 Ugo Conti as Pvt. Luciano Colasanti
 Antonio Catania as Lt. Carmelo La Rosa
 Memo Dini as Pvt. Libero Munaron
 Vasco Mirandola as Pvt. Felice Munaron
  (credited as Vanna Barba) as Vasilissa

Production

The script was written by Enzo Monteleone and is loosely based on the autobiographical novel Sagapò by Renzo Biasion. The script and the novel show marked differences in how they portray the Italian army in Greece, with the novel giving a more realistic account.

Filming took place on the Greek island of Kastellórizo, in the Dodecanese island complex.

Release
Mediterraneo was released in Italy on 31 January 1991 by Penta Distribuzione before premiering at the 1991 Toronto International Film Festival on 9 September 1991, where its North American distribution rights were purchased by Miramax Films. Internationally, the film was truncated by 10 minutes, resulting in an 86-minute cut.

The film was submitted as the Italian entry for the Academy Award for Best Foreign Language Film in November 1991. It was released in the United States in March 1992, a week before the Academy Awards and made its worldwide run over the next two years.

Box office
The film grossed $4.5 million in the United States and Canada, and was the highest-grossing non-English language film at the US box office that year but was later surpassed by Indochine which was released at Christmas 1992 and grossed most of its revenue in 1993.

Reception
Mediterraneo was received mostly positively by film critics. On review aggregator website Rotten Tomatoes, the film has a 79% score, based on 14 reviews, with an average rating of 6.33/10. Several critics linked the movie to the tradition of Italian neorealism. Nevertheless, the victory of the Academy Award raised some eyebrows, with The Washington Post describing the movie as a "schmaltzy island fantasy", and the Film Journal calling it a "clichéd number". Roger Ebert stated that this was the only film he ever walked out of because it was "utterly without redeeming merit".

Among historians the movie was discussed as a prime example of the myth of Italiani brava gente, the popular Italian belief that Italian soldiers were not complicit in war crimes and had distinguished themselves through humanity and compassion during World War II — in stark contrast to their ideologically motivated and brutal German allies. The movie fails to give any reference to the atrocities committed by Italians during the Axis occupation of Greece, while portraying Royal Italian Army soldiers as essentially good-natured people, if not cute, innocent buffoons. While in reality the burning of villages, the shooting of civilians and rapes were common features of the Italian occupation, the film goes so far as to show Italian aggressors happily mingling with the locals and even establishing consensual erotic relationships with Greek women.

Awards
It won the Academy Award for Best Foreign Language Film in 1992.

See also
 Captain Corelli's Mandolin, a 2001 war film set on the Greek Island of Cephalonia.

Notes

References

External links
 
 
 Mediterraneo at Variety Distribution

1991 films
1990s Italian-language films
1990s English-language films
1990s Greek-language films
1990s war comedy-drama films
1991 LGBT-related films
Italian LGBT-related films
Italian war comedy-drama films
Best Foreign Language Film Academy Award winners
Films directed by Gabriele Salvatores
Films set in Axis-occupied Greece
Films set in the Mediterranean Sea
Films set in the 1940s
Films set on islands
Films shot in Greece
Incest in film
Italian occupation of Greece during World War II
Kastellorizo
Polyamory in fiction
Miramax films
Italian World War II films
1991 multilingual films
Italian multilingual films